Charles Kenzie Steele (born February 17, 1914 in McDowell County, West Virginia; died  in Tallahassee, Florida) was a preacher and a civil rights activist.  He was one of the main organizers of the 1956 Tallahassee bus boycott, and a prominent member of the Southern Christian Leadership Conference. On March 23, 2018, Florida Governor Rick Scott signed CS/SB 382 into law, designating portions of Florida State Road 371 and Florida State Road 373 along Orange Avenue in Tallahassee as C.K. Steele Memorial Highway.

Background
Steele was the son of a coal miner, an only child. At a young age, he knew that he wanted to be a preacher, and he started preaching when he was 15 years old. Steele graduated from Morehouse College in 1938. He then began preaching in Toccoa and Augusta, Georgia, then in Montgomery, Alabama, at the Hall Street Baptist Church (1938–1952). In 1952 Steele moved to Tallahassee, where he started preaching at the Bethel Missionary Baptist Church. Steele met Martin Luther King Jr. when he was on his way to Tallahassee.

Tallahassee bus boycott

The Tallahassee bus boycott began in May, 1956, during the Montgomery bus boycott. Like other bus boycotts during the Civil Rights Movement in America, it started because black people were forced to ride in the back of the bus, and when two students refused to give up their seat to a white woman, they were arrested. An organization was formed to protest and boycott against the city bus system. The organization was called Inter-civic Council and Steele was elected president. Steele and other protesters boycotted the system by starting car pools and the bus system had stopped for the first time in 17 years on July 1. Steele was arrested many times during this period.

The people in Tallahassee thought that the protesters' demands were outrageous. Steele and the other protesters met a lot of rich and influential opposition. The Ku Klux Klan burned a cross in front of Steele's church, marched in front of his house, and threw bottles through his windows. The city commissioners were firmly opposed to integration of the buses. The bus system was integrated two years later.

He was also the lead plaintiff in the school desegregation suit, which led to the desegregation of public schools in Leon County.

Steele was also a part of many other protests, marches, and boycotts, where he helped to accomplish integration in many public places. Steele helped Dr. Martin Luther King Jr. organize the Southern Christian Leadership Conference (SCLC) in 1957. He was made the First Vice President under Dr. King at the time of the formation of SCLC.

Steele participated in the Selma to Montgomery marches in 1965.

Steele died from bone marrow cancer in 1980 at the age of 66 in Tallahassee.

Legacy
When the city created a new bus terminal in 1983, it was named after Steele and a statue of him (by sculptor David Lowe) was placed on the NE corner of the terminal.

Florida State University conferred on Steele the honorary Doctor of Humane Letters degree in 1980—the first to an African American, and the first to be bestowed in fifty-six years from that school.

The Bethel Baptist Church in Tallahassee, where Steele was a pastor for twenty-eight years, has established a charter school which is named in his and former Governor Leroy Collins' honor: the Steele-Collins Charter School.

In 2012 Steele was inducted into the Florida Civil Rights Hall of Fame.

On March 23, 2018, Florida Governor Rick Scott signed CS/SB 382 into law, designating portions of Florida State Road 371 and Florida State Road 373 along Orange Avenue in Tallahassee as C.K. Steele Memorial Highway.

Footnotes

Bibliography
Tallahassee Civil Rights Oral History Collection. Special Collections & Archives, Florida State University Libraries, Tallahassee, Florida.
McMullen, Cary. . Online Available, 1998
. Online Available 
. Online Available 

1914 births
1980 deaths
People from Bluefield, West Virginia
Activists from West Virginia
Deaths from multiple myeloma
Activists for African-American civil rights
People from Tallahassee, Florida
Victims of the Ku Klux Klan
20th-century Baptist ministers from the United States